Fluid Drive is the trademarked name that Chrysler Corporation assigned to a transmission driveline combination which replaced the flywheel with a hydraulic coupling and performed the same function as a modern torque converter, only without torque multiplication. A conventional clutch and three- or four-speed manual transmission was installed behind the fluid coupling. Fluid drive was used in many military vehicles produced for the US Armed Forces during the Second World War. It was offered for civilian use from 1939 through 1953 in Chryslers, 1940 through 1953 in DeSotos, and from 1941 through 1954 in Dodge models; a semi-automatic system was optional from Chrysler and Desoto from 1941, and for Dodge from 1949.

History
The fluid coupling and torque converter was invented by the German engineer Foettinger in the early 1900s. For non-marine applications he licensed the development of the fluid coupling to the British engineer Harold Sinclair and his Fluidrive Engineering Co Ltd (now part of Voith AG). Following the development of the fluid coupling, Sinclair in turn licensed the fluid coupling, now also known as "Fluidrive Coupling" to many companies including the Chrysler Corporation.  

Many automobile historians confuse Chrysler's Fluid Drive with the Corporation's so-called semi-automatic M5/M6 transmissions, which were marketed under various names as "Simplimatic" (Chrysler), "Tip-Toe Shift" (DeSoto), and "Gyro-Matic" (Dodge).  Chrysler contributed to the confusion by referring to both the standard-shift fluid drive and M6 installations indiscriminately as "Fluid Drive" in much of their marketing and sales literature. General Motors also used a fluid coupling for the full-automatic Hydramatic transmission, introduced for 1940.

Configuration
The standard Fluid Drive configuration consisted of the fluid coupling and a manual transmission and clutch in tandem. If the Fluid Drive was mated to a manual transmission, the driver still needed to use the clutch to shift between any of the gears. The presence of Fluid Drive, however, prevented the driver stalling when taking off from a dead stop. The driver could also come to a stop in any gear without using the clutch and could then proceed without shifting or using the clutch. Naturally, acceleration from a stop was much slower in high gear than it was in first. It must be emphasized that Fluid Drive was not a transmission, only a fluid coupling between the engine and clutch. 

Fluid Drive could also be mated to the semi-automatic transmission, which was not automatic in any way and should not be confused with Fluid Drive. With the semi-automatic transmissions, the driver shifted manually, selecting reverse or a low range and a high range.  Each 'range' had two speeds. To shift between them, the driver accelerated then released pressure on the accelerator. In high range, this shift point was about 23 mph (37 kmh). Once the transmission shifted into high speed range, the driver again depressed the accelerator pedal, and continued accelerating. Solenoids on the transmission connected to the carburetor and ignition system momentarily interrupted engine operation to allow trouble-free shifting.  

The driver could down-shift for passing by fully depressing the accelerator. The clutch was needed to change between low and high range. The fluid drive system allowed the driver to stop at a light or in traffic and remain in gear without depressing the clutch. The driver could, if not concerned with fast acceleration, drive the car all day long in high range, stopping and starting, without ever having to touch the clutch pedal or gearshift lever unless faster acceleration or reversing was required. For this reason, DeSotos and Dodges were favored by city cab companies from the mid Forties to early Fifties.  

The semi-automatic came under a variety of names - Vacamatic, Prestomatic, Fluidmatic (Chrysler), Simplimatic, Tip-Toe Hydraulic Shift (DeSoto) and Gyromatic (Dodge).   

A Fluid Drive Dodge with Gyromatic was far less expensive than a Hydramatic-equipped Pontiac, and had the effect of making city taxi-driving far easier.  In 1950, a Dodge Coronet, which had Fluid Drive standard, offered Gyromatic for $94.60 ($956.22 in 2017 dollars), while Hydramatic was a $158.50 option ($1,602.12) on Pontiacs.

M4 and M6 transmissions

The fluid drive fluid coupling was also used in conjunction with Chrysler's M6 Presto-Matic semi-automatic transmissions.  The M6 was in reality a two-speed manual transmission with a conventional clutch mounted behind the same fluid coupling unit that was installed in straight Fluid Drive cars.  

The M4 Vacamatic had two forward speeds and reverse. There was a manual Pull-Cable to lock out the underdrive in the early models.
From 1949–1952, Dodge models with the conventional 3-speed Fluid Drive carried front fender emblems that said “Fluid Drive.”  The M6 Models had emblems that proudly proclaimed “Gyromatic.”

In the 1941 brochure for Chrysler automobiles, a silhouette of the car's drivetrain was depicted against an outline of the car body, with the caption of an arrow pointing to the transmission: "Miracle Happens Here"!  The transmission shown was an early variant (M4 "Vacamatic") of the later M6 transmission and was marketed to compete with the new Oldsmobile fully automatic, clutchless Hydramatic transmission, introduced in the fall of 1939 on 1940 Model year Oldsmobiles.  The Hydramatic was embraced enthusiastically by consumers, and was installed in 45% of 1941 Model Oldsmobiles.

See also
 List of Chrysler transmissions

References

External links
Fluid Drive article on Allpar

Chrysler transmissions